Kulakov (masculine) or Kulakova (feminine) is a Russian surname. Notable people with the surname include:

 Alexander Kulakov, Belarusian ice hockey player
 Denys Kulakov, Ukrainian footballer
 Fyodor Kulakov (1918–1978), Soviet Politburo member
 Galina Kulakova (born 1942), Russian Soviet cross-country skier
 Ivan Kulakov, Russian geophysicist
 Natalya Kulakova (born 1985), Kazakhstani handball player
 Nikolai Kulakov (1908-1976), Soviet naval officer
 Vladimir Kulakov, 3rd Governor of Voronezh Oblast

See also 
 Russian destroyer Vice-Admiral Kulakov, a Soviet ship

Russian-language surnames